Saint Laud of Coutances (variants: Lauto, Laudo, Launus, popularly: Saint Lô) was the fifth bishop of Coutances and is venerated as a saint in the Roman Catholic and Eastern Orthodox Churches.

He was born in Courcy, near Coutances, in the 6th century AD  and became bishop of Coutances around 525. The town of Briovere, associated with the saint, took his name and is now Saint-Lô in Normandy. He met with a conclave of bishops at Angers in 529 or 530.

As a healing saint, he is invoked for maladies of the eyes and especially blindness. The reputed healing spring at Courcy dedicated to him is a site of pilgrimage.

He is commemorated September 21 in the French Martyrology, and September 22 in the Roman Martyrology.

References

Les Saints qui guérissent en Normandie, Gancel, 1998, 

5th-century births
6th-century deaths
People from Manche
6th-century Frankish saints
Bishops of Coutances